= Surface Ignition Alcohol CI Engine =

In this type of CI engine the surface-ignition plug is mounted on an alcohol fueled direct injection diesel engine.

== Basic concept ==
In this engine a slab of insulator material, wound with a few strands of heating wire is fixed on the combustion chamber with the wire running on the face exposed to the gases. Fuel injector is situated such that a part of the spray impinges head on this surface. Thus ignition is started. Combustion chamber cylinder head is made narrow so that the combustion spreads quickly to the rest of the space. A part of the fuel burns on the insulator surface and the heat losses from the plate are low, the surface after few minutes of operation reaches a temperature sufficient to start the ignition without the aid of external electric supply. The power consumption of the coil is around 52 W at 6 volts. The engine lends itself easily to the use of wide variety of fuels, including methanol, ethanol and gasoline. The engine runs without any interruption on methanol with a performance comparable to diesel operation. The engine works efficiently at lower speeds than at higher speeds.
